General Sir Charles Ash Windham (10 October 1810 – 2 February 1870) was a British Army officer and Liberal Party politician.

Biography

Educated at the Royal Military College, Sandhurst, Windham was commissioned as an ensign in the Coldstream Guards on 30 December 1826. Windham married Marianne Catherine Emily Beresford, daughter of Admiral Sir John Beresford, 1st Baronet, on 1 March 1849.

He led the charge on the Great Redan to the south of the Malakoff redoubt at Sevastopol on 8 September 1855 during the Battle of the Great Redan in the Crimean War. William Howard Russell, the correspondent of The Times, claimed that in doing so Windham had "saved the honour of the army." He also fought in the Second Battle of Cawnpore during the Indian Rebellion.

The Windham family were lords of the manor of Metton, Norfolk. Windham became a Member of Parliament (MP) for East Norfolk and held the seat from 1857 to 1859. 

Promoted to lieutenant-general on 5 February 1866, he became Commander of the British Troops in Canada in October 1867. 

Windham died in Florida, was interred temporarily in Montreal and finally buried in Hanwell cemetery, Middlesex, England.

References

Further reading
 
 Charles Ashe Windham: A Norfolk Soldier (1810-1870) by H.O. Mansfield. Terence Dalton Publishing, 1973
 The Crimean diary and letters of Lieut.-General Sir Charles Ash Windham, K.C.B.: with observations upon his services during the Indian mutiny, and an introduction by Sir William Howard Russell; the whole edited by Hugh Pearse (1897)

External links
 
 

1810 births
1870 deaths
British Army personnel of the Crimean War
Conservative Party (UK) MPs for English constituencies
UK MPs 1857–1859
British military personnel of the Indian Rebellion of 1857
People from Felbrigg
Charles Ash
British Army generals